The 1975 NCAA Division II Lacrosse Championship was the second annual single-elimination tournament to determine the national champions of NCAA Division II men's college lacrosse in the United States. That year's championship game was played at C.W. Post Stadium at the C.W. Post Campus of Long Island University in Brookville, New York. 

Cortland defeated Hobart in the final, 12−11, to win their first national title. The Red Dragons (10–4) were coached by Chuck Winters.

Qualification
All Division II men's lacrosse programs were eligible for this championship with a total of eight teams invited.

Bracket

See also
NCAA Division I Men's Lacrosse Championship
NCAA Division III Men's Lacrosse Championship (from 1980)
NCAA Division II Women's Lacrosse Championship (from 2001)

References

NCAA Division II Men's Lacrosse Championship
NCAA Division II Men's Lacrosse Championship
NCAA Division I Men's Lacrosse